Siripuram, Srikakulam District is a village and grampanchayat located in Santhakaviti Mandal in Andhra Pradesh, India. According to panchayat raj act, Siripuram is administrated by sarpanch, an elected representative of the village.

Demographics
The total population of the village is 5,206 of which are 2731 males and are 2475 females.

References 

Villages in Srikakulam district